Glenea coris is a species of beetle in the family Cerambycidae. It was described by Francis Polkinghorne Pascoe in 1867.

Subspecies
 Glenea coris coris Pascoe, 1867
 Glenea coris longitarsis Schwarzer, 1930

References

coris
Beetles described in 1867